Üsküplü Ata (died after 1533) was an Ottoman poet of the 16th century. The precise dates of his birth and death are unknown. His ancestors had migrated from Iran to Rumelia, whereafter they settled in Üsküp (Skopje, present-day North Macedonia).

References

Sources
 

16th-century poets from the Ottoman Empire
Poets from the Ottoman Empire
People from the Ottoman Empire of Iranian descent
Writers from Skopje
Male poets from the Ottoman Empire
16th-century deaths